Ray Miller is a Democratic politician and a former member of the Ohio General Assembly.

Life and career
A graduate of the Ohio State University and a former staffer in the Carter Administration, Miller was elected to the Ohio House of Representatives in 1982, succeeding Leslie Brown.  He won reelection in 1984, and 1986.  In 1988, he won a fourth term, and was named as President of the Legislative Black Caucus.  He again won reelection in 1990, and 1992.

In 1993, Miller resigned from the House to create a policy nonprofit organization, and was succeeded by Charleta Tavares.  However, his retirement was short lived.  He again ran for the seat in 1998, and won to succeed Tavares, who had left to take a seat on Columbus City Council.  He was reelected in 2000.

Ohio Senate
With Ben Espy being term limited in 2002, Miller sought to succeed him, and won the 15th District.  He took the seat on January 3, 2003, and was reelected in 2006.  In 2008, Miller led a successful political coup in which he replaced minority leader Teresa Fedor. However, following the 2008 elections, Miller stepped down from the post to begin his transition to the private sector. On January 10, 2011 Miller founded The Columbus African American news journal where he remains the journal's Publisher and Chairman .

Miller was term limited and unable to run again in 2010, and again was succeeded by Tavares.  He recently completed a six-year appointment on the Central State University Board of Trustees.

References

External links
Those Who Followed: Senator I. Ray Miller (D-Columbus)
Project Vote Smart - I. 'Ray' Miller Jr. profile
Follow the Money - Ray Miller
2006 2004 2002 2000 1998 campaign contributions

Democratic Party Ohio state senators
Democratic Party members of the Ohio House of Representatives
1949 births
Living people
Ohio State University alumni
21st-century American politicians
African-American people in Ohio politics
21st-century African-American politicians
20th-century African-American people